Malechkino is a rural locality (a settlement) and the administrative center of Malechkinskoye Rural Settlement, Cherepovetsky District, Vologda Oblast, Russia. The population was 2,200 as of 2002. There are 10 streets.

Geography 
Kurilovo is the nearest rural locality.

References 

Rural localities in Cherepovetsky District